The Shire of Mount Magnet is a local government area in the Mid West region of Western Australia, about  north-northeast of the state capital, Perth. The Shire of Mount Magnet current president is Jorgen Jensen, manager and owner of Yoweragabbie Station.

History

The Shire of Mount Magnet originated as the Mount Magnet Road District, established on 20 September 1901 covering the area surrounding (but initially not including) the town of Mount Magnet, which had already been incorporated as the Municipality of Mount Magnet in 1896.

The road district absorbed the Mount Magnet municipality on 18 October 1918, and on 1 July 1961, it became a shire following passage of the Local Government Act 1960, which reformed all remaining road districts into shires.

Wards
As of the 2005 elections, the Shire is no longer divided into wards and the nine councillors sit at large. Previously, there were two wards - Town Ward (six councillors) and Country Ward (three councillors).

Towns and localities
The towns and localities of the Shire of Mount Magnet with population and size figures based on the most recent Australian census:

Former towns
 Boogardie
 Lennonville
 Yoweragabbie

Heritage-listed places

As of 2023, 43 places are heritage-listed in the Shire of Mount Magnet, of which four are on the State Register of Heritage Places.

References

External links
 

 
Mount Magnet